Jiutaisaurus (meaning "Jiutai lizard") is a genus of sauropod dinosaur from the Quantou Formation of Jilin, China. Jiutaisaurus was a sauropod which lived during the Cretaceous. The type species, Jiutaisaurus xidiensis, was described by Wu et al. in 2006, and is based on eighteen vertebrae. It probably lived alongside Changchunsaurus and Helioceratops.

References

Macronarians
Cretaceous dinosaurs of Asia
Fossil taxa described in 2006